Allavaram mandal is one of the 22 mandals in Konaseema district of Andhra Pradesh. As per census 2011, there are 14 villages in this mandal.

Demographics 
Allavaram mandal has total population of 68,242 (as of 2011 census) out of which 34,034 are males while 34,208 are females. The average sex ratio is 965. The total literacy rate of is 78%.

Villages

Villages 
1. Allavaram
2. Bendamurulanka
3. Bodasakurru
4. Devaguptam
5. Godi
6. Godilanka
7. Gudala
8. Komaragiripatnam
9. Mogallamuru
10. Rellugadda
11. Samanthakuru
12. Tadikona
13. Thurupulanka
14. Yentrikona

See also 
List of mandals in Andhra Pradesh

References 

Mandals in Konaseema district
Mandals in Andhra Pradesh